The Minto Group is a Canadian real estate company, based in Ottawa, Ontario.  It builds homes in Ottawa, Toronto, Calgary, and Florida.  It also manages multi-residential and commercial properties in Ontario and Alberta.  It has built 85,000 new homes, and manages $2.9 billion in assets, including 13,000 multi-residential units and 2.7 million square feet of commercial space. The firm is one of Ottawa's largest residential landlords.  Minto also has a publicly traded subsidiary, holding some of its multi-residential units, called Minto Apartment Real Estate Investment Trust. Minto is also partners with Dellray Group, another leading real estate developer.

History 
Minto Group was founded in 1955 by Gilbert, Irving, Lorry and Louis Greenberg, as a home builder.  It was originally called Mercury Homes, but renamed itself Minto Construction Company in 1957. Its first large development was Parkwood Hills in Nepean in partnership with Westmore Investments. As part of that development, Minto built Canada's first high-rise condominium, Horizon House on Meadowlands Drive. The firm developed a number of other subdivisions in the Ottawa area in the 1960s and 1970s; in 1971, three quarters of construction in Nepean was by Minto.

In the early 1980s, the firm expanded to Florida.

In 1991, Roger Greenberg, son of Gilbert, became CEO, after the death of his uncle Irving.

In 2013, Michael Waters, who is not part of the Greenberg family, became CEO.

In May 2018, Minto announced it would hold an IPO for its Canadian multi-residential properties.  The properties became part of a new entity, Minto Apartment Real Estate Investment Trust (REIT), which Minto Group continues to have a significant ownership stake in. The trust would initially own 4279 rental suites, 72% of which would be in Ottawa, with the intention of eventually holding all of Minto's 13,000 multi-residential units. Minto Group held the IPO in part to provide money to Minto's owners, the Greenberg family.  Minto raised $200 million in the IPO, which took place on the Toronto Stock Exchange.  The IPO took place on June 29, 2018, with an initial price of $14.50 per share, and under the share symbol MI.UN.

Business 
Minto Group is divided into three divisions:
 Minto Apartments manages multi-residential and commercial properties, some of which have been built by Minto.  Minto Apartments owns 57% of Minto Apartment Real Estate Investment Trust.
 Minto Communities Canada is a home builder in Ottawa, Toronto, and Calgary.  It has built 60,000 homes over its history.  It builds both low-rise and high-rise housing, and in recent years has been building more luxury rental projects.  In 2015, Minto was the largest home builder in Ottawa, with 913 homes built, and 24 percent of the market.
 Minto Communities USA is a Florida home builder. It has built 25,000 homes over its history.  It was ranked as the 56th largest home builder in the United States in 2016.
The Greenberg family, who founded and still controls the Minto Group, was listed as the 74th richest people in Canada in 2017, according to Canadian Business.

Minto has been involved in a number of controversial developments, including Minto Mahogany in Manotick, the Minto Midtown in Davisville, Potter’s Key in Stittsville, and Minto West in Palm Beach.

Minto has also been involved in a number of controversies in its role as a landlord.  There have been complaints about the company's proposed rent increases.  Minto's 2017 decision to charge for visitor parking in its Ottawa buildings also angered some tenants.

Notable Developments

Neighbourhoods 

 Parkwood Hills in Nepean was built by Minto in the late 1950s and early 1960s.
 Crystal Beach in Nepean was built starting in 1961.
 Briargreen was built starting in 1966.
 Bayshore, Canada's first rental community, was built by Minto in the 1960s.
 Tanglewood was started in 1970.
 Chapel Hill in Orleans was largely built by Minto.
 Centrepointe in Nepean was largely built by Minto
 Morgan's Grant in Kanata was largely built by Minto.
 Avalon in Orleans was partly built by Minto.

Buildings 

 The Minto Metropole is the second tallest building in Ottawa.  It was completed in 2004.
 The Minto Midtown, a controversial residential complex in the Davisville neighbourhood of Toronto, was completed in 2007.

References

External links 
 Minto Timeline

Companies based in Ottawa
Real estate companies of Canada
Home builders
Construction and civil engineering companies established in 1955
1955 establishments in Ontario
Real estate companies established in 1955
Canadian companies established in 1955